Altez, is one of the tallest skyscrapers in Singapore and tied for the tallest residential building with Skysuites @ Anson. The building sits at the city centre of Tanjong Pagar.

Background 
The building was completed in 2014. The structure is primarily made from poured concrete and steel. It is 250 m (820 ft) tall and is 3,036 m2 (32,681 sq ft). Altez is tied for the 7th tallest building in Singapore.

See also 

 List of tallest buildings in Singapore
 List of tallest freestanding steel structures
 List of buildings

References

External links 
 Official website
 Emporis – Building ID #1168324

2014 establishments in Singapore
Residential buildings in Singapore
Skyscrapers in Singapore
Residential buildings completed in 2014